Citizen Rex is a graphic novel by American cartoonist brothers Gilbert (art) Mario Hernandez (writing), published by Dark Horse Comics in 2011.  It tells of the robot CTZ-RX-1 (a.k.a. "Citizen Rex") and his quest to avenge himself.  The story mixes science fiction, drama, mystery, and comedy.  Citizen Rex was first serialized as a six-issue limited series from Dark Horse that débuted in 2009.

References

Works cited

 
 

2011 graphic novels
American graphic novels
Gilbert Hernandez
Dark Horse Comics titles